The Nevis Island Administration is the devolved government of the island of Nevis within the Federation of St Kitts and Nevis.

Ministers
The ministers within the Nevis Island Administration are as follows:

See also

Nevis Island Assembly

References

External links
Official website
Cabinet

Politics of Saint Kitts and Nevis
Political organisations based in Saint Kitts and Nevis
Nevis